Sayyid Muhammad ibn Ali al-Idrisi (1876–1920) founded and ruled the Idrisid Emirate of sabya.

Biography
He was born at Sabya (now Saudi Arabia). He was a grandson of Sayyid Ahmad ibn Idris al-Fasi, a Moroccan scholar from Fez, who was head of a religious fraternity (tariqa) at Mecca and who acquired land at Sabya, settled there and died in 1837. The descendants of Sayyid Ahmed appear to have increased in wealth and influence and to have gradually supplanted the ruling sherifial family of Abu ‛Arish.

Sayyid Muhammad was educated partly at Al-Azhar University and partly by the Senussi at Kufra, and subsequently resided for a time in the Sudan, at Argo Island. On his return to Asir, his one ambition was to render that district independent of the Ottoman Empire. He gradually expanded his political power to include Mikhlaf el Yemen and a large part of the Tihamah, with control over several tribes outside these limits. He threw in his lot with the Allies in World War I, and was the inexorable foe of the Imam of Yemen.

See also 

 Idrisid dynasty
 Ahmad ibn Idris al-Fasi

Notes

Further reading
 Headley, R.L. "ʿAsīr." Encyclopaedia of Islam, Second Edition.
 Anne K. Bang, The Idrisi State of Asir 1906-1934: Politics, Religion and Personal Prestige as State-building factors in early twentieth century Arabia (London: Bergen Studies on the Middle East and Africa, 1996)

Emirs
1876 births
1920 deaths
Hasanids
19th-century rulers in Asia
20th-century rulers in Asia

19th-century Arabs
20th-century Arabs
19th-century Saudi Arabian people
20th-century Saudi Arabian people
Moroccan people of Arab descent